The 2021 Formula Nordic season will be the ninth season of the single-seater championship, and the third independent of the STCC branding, following the formation of the series' association in the wake of the STCC promoter's bankruptcy in 2018. 
Formula Nordic continues to use the previous Formula Renault 1.6 chassis and engines, as it used to go under the name of Formula Renault 1.6 Nordic before Renault Sport dropped its support for the 3.5 and 1.6 classes in late 2015. 
The season will begin on 18 June at Skellefteå Drivecenter Arena, and will conclude on 9 October at Ring Knutstorp after seven rounds. This season marked the start of a three season deal with Yokohama as the series' tyre supplier.

Drivers and Teams

Race calendar and results 

The season will start on the 18 June at Skellefteå Drivecenter Arena, and will conclude on 9 October at Ring Knutstorp after seven rounds. Like the previous season, the use of reversed grid races for the final race of the weekend, where the top 6 were inverted, was continued.

Championship standings 

 Qualifying points system

Points are awarded to the top 5 fastest qualifying times.

 Race points system

Points are awarded to the top 10 classified finishers, no points are offered for fastest lap. 

Two championships are held, the Junior Svenskt Mästerskap (JSM) for drivers under 26 years old holding a Swedish driver license, and the Formula Nordic Cup, the latter serving as the overall championship.

Formula Nordic Drivers' Championship (Nordic Cup and JSM)

References

External links 

 Official website

Formula Nordic
Formula Nordic
Nordic